Charles Loper Harris (August 24, 1834October 11, 1910) was an American lawyer, Republican politician, and Union Army officer in the American Civil War.  He served one term in the Wisconsin State Assembly and the Nebraska Senate.

Biography
Charles Loper Harris was born on August 24, 1834, in Bridgeton, New Jersey. Later, he moved to Madison, Wisconsin. Harris later moved again, this time to Cedar County, Nebraska. On October 11, 1910, Harris died at his home in Omaha, Nebraska, from injuries sustained in an automobile accident. He was married with two children.

Military career
Harris was an alumnus, although not a graduate, of the United States Military Academy. He was a member of the class of 1857, but he left after his first year when found deficient in mathematics. Instead of a career in the military, he chose to study law. After the breakout of the American Civil War, he joined the Union Army and was assigned to the 1st Wisconsin Infantry Regiment. Soon after, he was promoted to colonel and given command of the 11th Wisconsin Infantry Regiment. Harris and the regiment later took part in the Battle of Cotton Plant, where he sustained a severe wound and afterwards had to take a medical leave. After his return, Harris was given command of brigade operations in and around St. Louis, Missouri. In 1863, he and the 11th were attached to the XIX Corps under the command of future Speaker of the U.S. House of Representatives Nathaniel P. Banks. Harris then took part in the Battle of Port Gibson and the Red River Campaign. The 11th was re-assigned to the XVI Corps in 1864. Harris was mustered out of the volunteers on September 4, 1865. On January 13, 1866, President Andrew Johnson nominated Harris for appointment to the grade of brevet brigadier general of volunteers to rank from March 13, 1865, and the United States Senate confirmed the appointment on March 12, 1866.

Political career
Harris was hired by the Wisconsin State Assembly as sergeant-at-arms for the 1868 session of the Legislature.  He subsequently was elected to the Assembly from Door County, Wisconsin, in 1869.  He was a member of the Nebraska State Senate in 1883.

References

External links
 

|-

People from Bridgeton, New Jersey
Military personnel from Madison, Wisconsin
People from Cedar County, Nebraska
People of Wisconsin in the American Civil War
Road incident deaths in Nebraska
Union Army colonels
Nebraska state senators
United States Military Academy alumni
1834 births
1910 deaths
19th-century American politicians
Military personnel from New Jersey